Littmann is a surname. Notable people with the name include:

 Corny Littmann (born 1952), German entrepreneur, entertainer, and theater owner
 David Littmann (1906–1981), German-American cardiologist
 Enno Littmann (1875–1958), German orientalist
 Max Littmann (1862–1931), German architect
 Heilmann & Littmann

See also 
 Littman
 Litman